Toni Mäkiaho (born January 11, 1975) is a retired Finnish professional ice hockey player.

External links

References 

1975 births
Finnish expatriate ice hockey players in Russia
Finnish ice hockey right wingers
HC Fribourg-Gottéron players
HC Lada Togliatti players
HIFK (ice hockey) players
HPK players
Living people
Malmö Redhawks players
Lahti Pelicans players
Tappara players
Timrå IK players
Ice hockey people from Tampere